John Francis Campbell (born April 11, 1957) is a retired United States Army general who was commander of the Resolute Support Mission and United States Forces – Afghanistan. He was the 16th and last commander of the International Security Assistance Force. Prior to this, he served as the 34th Vice Chief of Staff of the United States Army. He is currently a member of the board of directors of IAP, and BAE Systems, and serves on the advisory board of Code of Support Foundation.

Early life and education
The son of a United States Air Force senior master sergeant, Campbell was born at Loring Air Force Base in Maine on April 11, 1957 and grew up on military bases around the world. In 1971 he became an Eagle Scout in Fairfield, California's Boy Scout Troop 270. In 1975 he graduated from Fairfield High School, where he was a participant in the Air Force Junior Reserve Officers' Training Corps (JROTC) program. He graduated from the United States Military Academy in June 1979 and was commissioned as a second lieutenant in the infantry. His first assignments were as a rifle platoon leader, company executive officer, and anti-tank platoon leader with the 3rd Battalion, 28th Infantry Regiment in Wiesbaden, Germany.

Military career
After attending the Infantry Officer Advanced Course and the Special Forces Qualification Course, Campbell served as a Battalion Adjutant and Operational Detachment Alpha Commander in 1st Battalion, 5th Special Forces Group (Airborne) at Fort Bragg, North Carolina followed by assignments in the 82nd Airborne Division as commander of Bravo Company, 3rd Battalion, 505th Parachute Infantry Regiment and as the Division Assistant Operations and Training Officer (G-3 Air).

Campbell was then assigned as the Assistant Professor of Military Science and then the Professor of Military Science at the University of California, Davis.

He was selected to attend the Command and General Staff College, after which he was again assigned to Ft. Bragg and the 82nd Airborne Division, where he served as the Division Training and Operations (G-3) Officer, Brigade Operations Officer (S-3) for 2nd Brigade, 325th Airborne Infantry Regiment and as the Aide-de-camp for the XVIII Airborne Corps Commander (deployed during Operation Uphold Democracy).

Campbell commanded the 2nd Battalion 5th Infantry Regiment, 25th Infantry Division at Schofield Barracks, Hawaii followed by attendance at the United States Army War College in Carlisle, Pennsylvania. Upon graduation, he was assigned to the Joint Staff.

Campbell commanded 1st Brigade, 82nd Airborne Division and the 504th Parachute Infantry Regiment and deployed his Brigade Combat Team to Afghanistan in support of Operation Enduring Freedom.

Following command Campbell was assigned to the Army Staff and served as the Executive Officer to the 35th Chief of Staff of the United States Army, Peter J. Schoomaker.

General officer assignments
After promotion to general officer, in 2005, Campbell was assigned to Fort Hood, Texas as the Deputy Commanding General for Maneuver (DCG-M) for the 1st Cavalry Division and deployed to Iraq in support of Operation Iraqi Freedom as the DCG-M for Multi-National Division – Baghdad for both the 4th Infantry Division and the 1st Cavalry Division. Campbell's following assignment was as the Deputy Director for Regional Operations, (J-33), The Joint Staff.

In 2009, Campbell was named Commanding General, 101st Airborne Division, at Fort Campbell, Kentucky. While serving as the Commanding General, he also commanded Combined Joint Task Force 101 the operational headquarters for Regional Command East in Afghanistan from June 2010 to May 2011. Upon relinquishing command of the 101st Airborne Division in August 2011 to Major General James C. McConville, Campbell was promoted to Lieutenant General and became the Army Deputy Chief of Staff for Operations, Plans and Training (G-3/5/7).

Campbell was promoted to general and sworn in as the Vice Chief of Staff of the United States Army on 8 March 2013.

On July 23, 2014, Campbell was confirmed by the United States Senate to succeed General Joseph Dunford as commander International Security Assistance Force and United States Forces—Afghanistan. Campbell was succeeded by General John W. Nicholson Jr., on March 2, 2016, and retired on May 1, 2016.

On July 25, 2016, Turkish daily Yeni Şafak wrote that Campbell was "behind the failed coup" that started on July 15.  Campbell dismissed the allegation, stating that he had not traveled outside the United States since returning home from Afghanistan.  He also stated that on the day of the coup, he and journalist Geraldo Rivera had met to socialize over drinks, a claim Rivera corroborated.

Dates of rank

Awards and decorations

See also
 Kunduz hospital airstrike

References

External links

 

Living people
United States Army generals
United States Army personnel of the War in Afghanistan (2001–2021)
United States Military Academy alumni
United States Army Command and General Staff College alumni
United States Army War College alumni
Members of the United States Army Special Forces
United States Army Vice Chiefs of Staff
Recipients of the Defense Superior Service Medal
Recipients of the Distinguished Service Medal (US Army)
Recipients of the Legion of Merit
Recipients of the Air Medal
1957 births